Scythris bosicornella is a moth of the family Scythrididae. It was described by Bengt Å. Bengtsson in 2014. It is found in Limpopo, South Africa.

References

Endemic moths of South Africa
bosicornella
Moths described in 2014